The University of North Dakota Writers Conference is an annual literary event held at the University of North Dakota (UND) located in Grand Forks, North Dakota, whose mission is to offer open access to the arts and create opportunities for discussion of how they impact our every day lives. The Writers Conference is known for being one of the most distinguished cultural events on campus and the state. It brings prominent writers from the United States and abroad to Grand Forks. To date, the Conference has hosted over 360 authors (most genres) and artists to its literary event, including thirty-five Pulitzer Prize winners, four recipients of the Nobel Prize, and many others who have received awards from the MacArthur Foundation, National Book Foundation, National Book Critics Circle, Academy of Motion Picture Arts and Sciences, and more. The participants are by invite only, but all events are, and have always been, free and open to the public.

In recent years, thanks in part to grants from the National Endowment for the Arts, over 150 hours of archival video footage is now freely available for educational, scholarly, and historical purposes at commons.und.edu/writers-conference.

References

External links
UND Writers Conference website
UND Writers Conference Digital Collection

Writers Conference
Events in North Dakota
North Dakota culture
Tourist attractions in Grand Forks, North Dakota
Writers' conferences